The men's 50 kilometres race walk at the 1966 European Athletics Championships was held in Budapest, Hungary, on 3 September 1966.

Medalists

Results

Final
3 September

Participation
According to an unofficial count, 26 athletes from 12 countries participated in the event.

 (2)
 (3)
 (2)
 (2)
 (2)
 (1)
 (1)
 (3)
 (3)
 (1)
 (3)
 (3)

References

50 kilometres race walk
Racewalking at the European Athletics Championships